Calodera is a genus of beetles belonging to the family Staphylinidae.

The genus was first described by Mannerheim in 1830.

The genus has cosmopolitan distribution.

Species:
 Calodera aethiops
 Calodera nigrita
 Calodera protensa
 Calodera riparia
 Calodera rubens
 Calodera rufescens
 Calodera uliginosa

References

Aleocharinae
Staphylinidae genera